Two ships of the United States Navy have been named USS Jupiter:

  served as a collier from 1913 to 1920 and was converted into the U.S. Navy's first aircraft carrier, being renamed  on 21 April 1920 and being recommissioned as an aircraft carrier in 1922.
 , a cargo ship commissioned 22 August 1942 and scrapped in March 1971.

See also
 Jupiter (disambiguation)

United States Navy ship names